Bernal Aguilar (born 1981), also known as Tokebi (Korean: 도깨비) is a Guatemalan artist, illustrator, and university professor,  best known for the use of skulls, bright neon colors and Kitsch aesthetic in his work. Tokebi rose to popularity when was personally chosen by Grammy winner heavy metal band Mastodon to design their merchandise for the 2019's European Tour. Tokebi is especially popular among rock bands, rappers and DJs, and is seen as one of the international ambassadors of the Guatemalan lowbrow movement.

Career 
Tokebi's artistic career began in 2010 on the streets of Hongdae, Seoul, where he used to sell his pieces on signed prints and t-shirts, gaining recognition in local media for thriving as a foreigner. In 2014 Tokebi with a group of local and international artists founded and participated in an artistic collective exhibition with the aim of uniting international and Korean artists called Nothing Serious I  and Nothing Serious II respectively, in Seoul, South Korea. However, most of his work is related to the music industry, especially in the indie, rock, hip hop and electronic music scene, working with bands like Grammy winner Mastodon, Calcium, and local bands in United States, Australia, Europe, among others. Tokebi is currently teaching university courses in Digital Illustration, Graphic and Multimedia Design at the Universidad del Istmo in Guatemala, and his artistic career is now orbiting the non-fungible assets or NFT market. In 2022, the Ministry of Culture and Sports of Guatemala enlisted Tokebi in the National Artist Registry.

References 

1981 births
Guatemalan artists
Living people
Guatemalan contemporary artists